Venus and Mars may refer to:

Art
 Venus and Mars (sculpture), a 2nd-century sculpture of Hadrian and Sabina as the deities
 Venus and Mars (Botticelli), a 15th-century painting by Sandro Botticelli
 Venus and Mars (Veronese), a 16th-century painting by Paolo Veronese

Film
 Venus and Mars (2001 film), a German film with Lynn Redgrave
 Venus and Mars (2007 film), a South Korean film

Music
Venus and Mars (Wings album) (1975)
 "Venus and Mars/Rock Show", a 1975 single by Wings
 Venus & Mars (Jett Rebel album)

See also 
 The Loves of Mars and Venus, an 18th-century ballet
Mars & Venus, a 2007 Norwegian film by Eva Dahr with Pia Tjelta and Thorbjørn Harr